Diplolaemus bibronii, commonly known as Bibron's iguana, is a species of lizard in the family Leiosauridae. It is native to Argentina and Chile.

References

Diplolaemus
Reptiles described in 1843
Reptiles of Argentina
Reptiles of Chile
Taxa named by Thomas Bell (zoologist)